Ganepola Arachchige Duleep Pandula Perera Wijesekera is a Sri Lankan politician. He is a member of the United People's Freedom Alliance (UPFA) and member of the Sri-Lankan parliament for the Gampaha District since 2004. He was the Deputy Minister of Disaster Management in the Parliament of Sri Lanka.

He was removed from his ministerial position by president Maithripala Sirisena on 29 October 29, 2017. On 30 October 2017 he crossed over to the opposition. The crossover was not valid since the meeting in the parliament was a committee meeting on 30 October and not a regular parliament sitting day.

See also
Politics of Sri Lanka

References

Living people
Sri Lankan Buddhists
Members of the 13th Parliament of Sri Lanka
Members of the 15th Parliament of Sri Lanka
Sri Lanka Podujana Peramuna politicians
Sri Lanka Freedom Party politicians
United People's Freedom Alliance politicians
Sinhalese politicians
1957 births